Legislative elections were held in French Polynesia in May 1996 for the Territorial Assembly. The result was a victory for Tahoera'a Huiraatira, which won 22 of 41 seats. The pro independence Tāvini Huiraʻatira  more than doubled its representation, from 4 to 10 seats, Aia Api won five, and Here Ai'a one. The remaining three seats were taken by independents Boris Léontieff (affiliated to the Fetia Api party), Tinomana Ebb, and Lucien Kimitete.

Following the election Gaston Flosse was re-elected as President of French Polynesia.

Results

References

French
Legislative
Elections in French Polynesia
Election and referendum articles with incomplete results